Whittock is a surname. Notable people with the surname include:

 Louise Whittock (1896–1951), English actress, singer, and broadcaster
 Nathaniel Whittock (1791–1860), British engraver
 Tecwen Whittock

See also
 Whitlock (surname)